Chenoa Maxwell (born November 16, 1969) is an American actress and photographer.

Career
Maxwell is best known for her starring role in the 1997 romantic comedy Hav Plenty and as the recurring character Lena Turner on the hit UPN sitcom Girlfriends. Maxwell starred in docu-reality show Love In The City on OWN, Oprah Winfrey Network. Maxwell has also appeared in the WB sitcom For Your Love and in the 2002 film G, a modernized, loosely-based adaptation of The Great Gatsby starring Richard T. Jones and Blair Underwood, and directed by Christopher Scott Cherot. She appeared in R&B singer Joe's video, What if a Woman. She also had a cameo in the infomercial for 'Yoga Booty Ballet'. Maxwell also appears frequently as a guest expert on WEtv’s Growing Up Hip-Hop.

In 2006, she moved to London to study photography. Her first solo art exhibit, Introspection: India, ran for one month at the Papillion Institute of Art in Los Angeles in March 2011. Her work has been exhibited in the Bay Area, New York City, and Italy.

Filmography

Film

Television

References

External links

American photographers
American television actresses
Living people
Actresses from New Rochelle, New York
1969 births
African-American actresses
American film actresses
American women photographers
21st-century African-American people
21st-century African-American women
20th-century African-American people
20th-century African-American women